Lahkmen Rymbui is a United Democratic Party politician from Meghalaya. He has been elected in Meghalaya Legislative Assembly election in 2008 from War Jaintia Legislative Assembly from Congress Party and in 2018 from Amlarem constituency as candidate of United Democratic Party. He is the Minister of Border Areas Development, Education, Forests & Environment in Conrad Sangma ministry from 2018 and also Home (Police) from 11/02/2020.
W.e.f. 01/10/2020 Minister I/c Home (Police), Border Areas Department, Education, District Council Affairs Govt. of Meghalaya.

References 

Living people
United Democratic Party (Meghalaya) politicians
Meghalaya MLAs 2018–2023
Meghalaya MLAs 2008–2013
Year of birth missing (living people)
People from West Jaintia Hills district
Indian National Congress politicians